The Second Waterhouse Ministry was the 8th Ministry of the Government of South Australia, led by George Waterhouse. It commenced on 17 October 1861, when George Waterhouse, who had led a nine-day temporary ministry to deal with dissident judge Benjamin Boothby, won support to remain Premier with a reconstituted ministry.  The ministry resigned in July 1863 after nearly being defeated on a budget motion, passing only with the Speaker's casting vote on a procedural basis. It was succeeded on 4 July by the First Dutton Ministry, another temporary ministry headed by Francis Dutton, who had moved the vote to bring down the Waterhouse ministry.

References

Waterhouse 2
1861 establishments in Australia